Morada Nova is a Brazilian breed of domestic sheep. It originates in the state of Ceará, in Nordeste, the north-eastern region of Brazil, on the Atlantic coast.

Characteristics

Use 

The Morada Nova is well adapted to the varied climatic conditions of the sertão, and well able to forage in the caatinga scrub biome of the area. It is reared principally for meat. Animals are slaughtered when they are between 18 and 24 months old, when they weigh  Males are not usually castrated. The hides are of good quality. Ewes are not milked, and the sheep are not shorn.

References

Sheep breeds
Sheep breeds originating in Brazil
Livestock